Eulji Mundeok Hansi is the oldest surviving poem in Korean literature.

Context
In the second Goguryeo-Sui War, Eulji Mundeok maneuvered the Goguryeo troops so that they engaged the Sui army seven times a day, each time feigning defeat and retreating, leading the Sui army deeper south with the perception of victory. The Sui army eventually advanced to about 20 km from Pyeongyang, the capital of Goguryeo. However, realizing the advanced hunger and exhaustion of his troops, and perceiving the formidable fortifications of Pyeongyang, Yu Zhongwen realised the looming impossibility of continuing the campaign. To taunt Yu Zhongwen, Eulji wrote the poem in sarcasm and sent it to the enemy general. The Sui army was annihilated at the Battle of Salsu.

Text
The poem reads,

See also
Korean poetry
Korean literature

 

Korean poetry
Chinese-language literature of Korea